NGC 6934 (also known as Caldwell 47) is a globular cluster of stars in the northern constellation of Delphinus, about  distant from the Sun. It was discovered by the German-born astronomer William Herschel on 24 September 1785. The cluster is following a highly eccentric orbit (with an eccentricity of 0.81) through the Milky Way along an orbital plane that is inclined by 73° to the galactic plane. It may share a common dynamic origin with NGC 5466. As of 2018, it has been poorly studied.

This appears to be a Oosterhoff type I cluster with an intermediate metallicity. The estimated mass is 295,000 times the mass of the Sun. The cluster displays photometric anomalies, with a split subgiant branch on the HR diagram. Searches for variable stars have discovered 85 in the cluster field, of which 79 are of the RR Lyrae class and one is a SX Phe variable. There is some evidence for a tidal tail.

References

External links
 
 
 A Distant Backwater of the Milky Way — ESA/Hubble Picture of the Week

Globular clusters
Delphinus (constellation)
6934
047b
Astronomical objects discovered in 1785